The Seminole State Forest is in the U.S. state of Florida. The  forest is located in Central Florida, near Eustis. Access to the forest is available from Florida State Road 44, Lake County Road 46A and Florida State Road 46. Surrounding parks and preserved areas include Lower Wekiva River Preserve State Park, Rock Springs Run State Reserve, Lake Norris Conservation Area, and the Ocala National Forest. The Florida National Scenic Trail runs through the from southeast to northwest.

See also
List of Florida state forests
List of Florida state parks

References

External links
 Seminole State Forest: Florida Division of Forestry- FDACS
 U.S. Geological Survey Map at the U.S. Geological Survey Map Website. Retrieved January 14, 2023.

Florida state forests
Protected areas of Lake County, Florida